The 1999 Giro d'Italia was the 82nd edition of the Giro d'Italia, one of cycling's Grand Tours. The field consisted of 162 riders, and 116 riders finished the race.

By rider

By nationality

References

1999 Giro d'Italia
1999